56 Henry is an American contemporary art gallery owned by Eleanor Rines. It is located at 56 Henry Street in New York City.

History 
Rines opened her first gallery, 55 Gansevoort, in New York's Meatpacking District in 2013. The gallery was known for showcasing unique emerging and established artists in its modest storefront space. When the space was sold by the owners in August 2015, Rines moved the gallery to 56 Henry in New York's Two Bridges neighborhood of Lower Manhattan, bordering Chinatown, and changed its name accordingly. It is located at street level, and the gallery’s exhibitions are visible to the public twenty-four hours a day. The gallery opened a second location, 105 Henry in 2022.

Artists 

 LaKela Brown
 Al Freeman
 Nikita Gale
 Kunle Martins
 Richard Tinkler
 Cynthia Talmadge
 Jo Messer
 David Roy
 Clayton Schiff

References

External links 

Contemporary art galleries in the United States
Art museums and galleries in Manhattan
2013 establishments in New York City
Lower Manhattan